Euploea wallacei , is a butterfly in the family Nymphalidae. It was described by Cajetan Felder and Rudolf Felder in 1860. It is found in the  Australasian realm The name honours Alfred Russel Wallace.

Subspecies
E. w. wallacei (Morotai, Ternate, Halmahera, Bachan)
E. w. grayi   C. & R. Felder, [1865]  (Aru)
E. w. confusa    Butler, 1866  (Waigeu)
E. w. gilda  Fruhstorfer, 1904 (Obi, Buru)
E. w. melia Fruhstorfer, 1904  (New Guinea to Goodenough Island, Fergusson Island)

Biology
The larva feeds on Ficus and Parsonsia species.

References

External links
Euploea at Markku Savela's Lepidoptera and Some Other Life Forms

Euploea
Butterflies described in 1860
Taxa named by Baron Cajetan von Felder
Taxa named by Rudolf Felder